Rocket is the Primitive Radio Gods' debut album, released on June 18, 1996 by Columbia Records. Their best known single from this album, "Standing Outside a Broken Phone Booth with Money in My Hand", helped launch the band's career.

Reception
Despite the critical acclaim surrounding the lead single, the album as a whole received negative reviews from critics. AllMusic critic Stephen Thomas Erlewine wrote "With its loping, unthreatening hip-hop beats and its looped B.B. King sample, "Standing" had all the appeal of an adult novelty for most listeners—it was something that was out of the ordinary, to be sure, but not something that you would want to investigate much further. Sadly, Primitive Radio Gods' debut mini-album, Rocket, proves those doubters right." Erlewine criticized the frequency of sampling in the album, stating "Most of Rocket sounds exactly like somebody messing around with a four-track, more intent on capturing sounds, not songs. Usually, this would at least result in some interesting sounds, but O'Connor hasn't even managed that", and concluded with "At its core, Rocket sounds like a demo tape with one promising song".

Sputnikmusic writer Adam Downer lauded the lead single but panned the rest of the album, writing "Primitive Radio Gods never attempt to replicate "Broken Phone Booth" in terms atmosphere or quality, and the rest of Rocket runs like a cluster[fuck] of everything between cheesy 80's hair metal and long-since forgotten 90's alternative rock." Downer also criticized the lyrics, writing "Worse than their inability to find a niche in terms of genre is the curiously pretentious attitude the Primitive Radio Gods give off. This is mostly due in part to O’Connor’s lyrical skill, which fails at portraying every emotion from cockiness to anger. O’Connor’s lyrics are laughably awful: Preachy, amateurish, and unjustifiably pissed off at matters like religion, urban life, and stardom, three topics which he appears to have only a skin-deep understanding of judging from the stupidity of his words." Much like AllMusic, Downer also noted the sampling, writing: "Furthering Primitive Radio Gods’ pretension is their obnoxious use of samples, which, though successful on “Broken Phone Booth”, grow obtrusive with continued incorporation, at times sucking any hint of listenability out of tracks on Rocket."

Perhaps the most negative review came from Pitchfork writer Ryan Schreiber, who said "At any rate, you don't want Rocket in your record collection now or ever since the music sounds like a third-rate, decaffeinated version of Ned's Atomic Dustbin and because, by reading Pitchfork, you've already proven you have better taste than that (I hope)." Schreiber gave it an extremely negative rating of 1.2/10, falling under "Awful, not a single pleasant track". However, Schreiber wrote that "Phone Booth" "as a single, is going to sell like the Rubik's Cube.", but that "as an album? Let's face it: Three minutes is enough for even the most mind-numbed, tasteless societal outcast."

Track listing
All songs written by Chris O'Connor, except where noted.
"Women" – 4:18
"Motherfucker" – 5:20
"Standing Outside a Broken Phone Booth with Money in My Hand" – 5:38
"Who Say" – 3:24
"The Rise and Fall of Ooo Mau" – 3:50
"Where the Monkey Meets the Man" (O'Connor, Jeff Sparks) – 4:17
"Are You Happy?" (O'Connor, Sparks)– 5:35
"Chain Reaction" – 4:47
"Skin Turns Blue" – 4:27
"Rocket" – 4:42

Chart performance
Album

Singles

References

1996 debut albums
Columbia Records albums
Primitive Radio Gods albums